

Participating nations

Men's tournament

Women's tournament

Medal summary

Medal table

References

2018 South American Games events
South American Games
2018
2018 South American Games